Ogasawarana capsula is a species of land snail with an operculum, a terrestrial gastropod mollusk in the family Helicinidae, the helicinids.

Distribution
This species is endemic to Japan.

References

Helicinidae
Molluscs of Japan
Gastropods described in 1902
Taxonomy articles created by Polbot